Takashi Kanemoto (born 12 December 1970) is a Japanese professional golfer.

Kanemoto was born in Hiroshima Prefecture. He currently plays on the Japan Golf Tour where he has twice: the 2009 Mitsubishi Diamond Cup Golf and the 2010 The Championship by Lexus.

Professional wins (5)

Japan Golf Tour wins (2)

Japan Golf Tour playoff record (1–2)

Japan Challenge Tour wins (1)

Other wins (2)
2000 Chushikoku Open (Japan)
2001 Chushikoku Open (Japan)

External links

Japanese male golfers
Japan Golf Tour golfers
Sportspeople from Hiroshima Prefecture
1970 births
Living people